Joseph Alan Steighner (born September 28, 1950) is a former Democratic member of the Pennsylvania House of Representatives.

Career
In 1978, Steighner was elected to represent Pennsylvania's 11th District in the Pennsylvania House of Representatives.

During his time in office, Steighner served as the Chairman of the House Games and Fisheries Committee, and sat as a member of the House Conservation Committee.

Following his retirement from the House on November 30, 1994, he became a lobbyist for several groups, including Gaming World International Ltd., which sought to begin riverboat gambling if the correct laws were passed. Other groups included Harrisburg law firm Balaban and Balaban, the Delta Development Corporation, and the Fraternal Congress. Under the state's Ethics Law, he was permitted to lobby members of the Pennsylvania State Senate immediately upon retirement, and permitted to lobby House members after a year.

Personal life
Steighner has at least two children: a son (Christopher) and a daughter (Bethann).

References

Democratic Party members of the Pennsylvania House of Representatives
Living people
1950 births